The William Underwood Company, founded in 1822, was an American food company best known for its flagship product Underwood Deviled Ham, a canned meat spread. The company also had a key role in time-temperature research done at the Massachusetts Institute of Technology (MIT) from 1895 to 1896, which led to the development of food science and food technology as a profession.

History

Canned foods 

Before moving to the United States, William Underwood worked as an apprentice at Mackey & Company in London, bottling food and exporting it to South America. He moved to the United States in 1817, arriving at New Orleans. According to family legend he walked from New Orleans to Boston.

The William Underwood Company of Boston was established by William Underwood (1787–1864) in 1822 in Boston, Massachusetts, as a condiment company using glass packing techniques. Among the condiments and other items glass packed were mustard, ketchup of various kinds, many types of pickled vegetables, and cranberries, primarily focusing on mustard and pickling. By 1836, Underwood shifted his packing from glass to steel cans coated with tin on the inside because glassmakers in the Boston area could not keep up with product demands from the canning company. The company shipped its products to South America, the West Indies and in Asia. In 1939, the bookkeepers of the William Underwood Company standardized the use of the word 'can' instead of 'tin canister'.

Underwood's canned foods proved valuable to settlers during the Manifest Destiny period of 1840–60. Later, Underwood sold numerous canned foods to Union troops during the American Civil War of 1861–65. The number of products canned increased to include seafood products, such as lobster, oyster, and mackerel. William Underwood died in 1864, the same year that William Lyman Underwood, one of his three grandsons, was born. Underwood's son, William James Underwood, would head the business as new retort technology continued to be developed for use. In 1880, Underwood opened the first sardine factory in Jonesport, Maine, known as one of the largest sardine factories in the world.

In 1896, the William Underwood Company started to export its spread ham to Venezuela, leading to the creation of the brand 'Diablitos Underwood deviled ham' in 1960 by General Mills. In 1906, the Massachusetts Board of Health banned all deviled meats, except Underwood's, from sale in Massachusetts. The National Billposters' Association, based in Chicago, center of America's meat packing industry at the time, then banned its members from posting bills with devil images on them. In 1907, a shipment of Underwood canned goods was denied entry on the territory by the Argentinian customs because small traces of boric acid were found in the canned foods.

Research with MIT 

From its beginning, the company encountered the problem of cans swelling, causing a great deal of product loss. In late 1895, William Lyman Underwood, a grandson of the founder, approached William Thompson Sedgwick, the chair of the biology department at MIT about the concerns he had with product swells and explosion of cans of clams. Sedgwick conferred with his assistant, Samuel Cate Prescott, and from late 1895 to late 1896, Prescott and Underwood worked on the problem every afternoon, focusing on canned clams. They discovered that the clams contained heat-resistant bacterial spores that were able to survive the processing; then they learned that these spores' presence depended on the clams' living environment, and finally that these spores would be killed if processed at 250 °F (121 °C) for 10 minutes in a retort.

These studies prompted the similar research of canned lobster, sardines, peas, tomatoes, corn, and spinach. Prescott and Underwood's work was first published in late 1897. This research, which was never patented, proved beneficial to the William Underwood Company, the canning industry, the food industry, and food technology itself.

In the mid-1950s, outgoing company president W. Durant brought new president George Seybolt to MIT to meet Prescott. At the Institute of Food Technologists Northeast Section (Maine, Massachusetts, New Hampshire, Rhode Island, and Vermont) meeting at Watertown, Massachusetts, in April 1961, the William Underwood Company dedicated a new laboratory in honor of both Prescott and William Lyman Underwood. Following Prescott's death in 1962, the William Underwood Company created the Underwood Prescott Memorial Lectureship in memory of both Underwood and Prescott. This Lectureship would run until 1982. In 1969, Seybolt donated $600,000 to MIT to create the Underwood Professorship, followed up with an Underwood Prescott Professorship in 1972. Three MIT faculty have held this professorship since its inception: Samuel A. Goldblith, Gerald N. Wogan, and since 1996, Steven R. Tannenbaum.

Expansion in 1960s 

Underwood acquired the Appert label in 1964, and the Burnham & Morrill (B&M) Company of Portland, Maine, in 1965. B&M had actually purchased canned clams and tomatoes from Underwood in the late 1860s for resale before producing these products on its own. Baked beans were the best known product that B&M produced, which it began doing in the 1920s with its Brick Oven Baked Beans. Piermont Foods, a food company in Montreal, Canada, was acquired in 1968 in order for Underwood to sell its products north of the border. In 1974, Underwood acquired the canned goods producer Shippam's.

Sale to PET 

Underwood, which up to this point had been privately owned by the Underwood family, was sold to Pet, Inc., in 1982. B&M Foods was included as part of the sale, and the Underwood headquarters building in Westwood, Massachusetts, was closed as a result.  Thirteen years later, in 1995, the Pillsbury Company acquired Pet, Inc., and began a modernization process that included warehousing, production, and processing. In 1999, New York's B&G Foods acquired the Underwood foods business, including the line of Underwood's canned meat spreads, sardines, B&M products, and Accent.

Deviled ham and devil logo 

Underwood first canned deviled ham in 1868 as a mixture of ground ham with seasonings; deviling would also be done with other meat and seafood products, including turkey, chicken,  tongue and lobster. Deviling consists of adding such spices as pepper sauce, cayenne pepper, Dijon mustard, or chopped chili peppers. Deviled eggs are one well-known example of this process. The devil logo was trademarked in 1870 and the company claims in its own literature that it is the oldest food trademark still in use in the United States. The red devil that debuted in 1895 and started as a demonic figure evolved into a much friendlier version when compared to the original.

The older version, in use during the first half of the 20th century, can be seen in many old magazine advertisements, such as one from Woman's Home Companion, August 1921. It lacks the pitchfork and smile of the modern version, but has long fingernails or claws not found in the modern version. The barbed tail is in the shape of the letter W, and along with the lower-case M to the right of the devil forms the abbreviation "Wm.", for William, as in William Underwood. The lettering in the logo and on the can are also spouting small flames, reinforcing the spicy devil concept. In 2008, B&G Foods updated the devil logo by adding color to the previously all-red image. The pitchfork became black, and small amounts of yellow were added in the tail and horns, along with shading to add depth. The yellow in the tail and horns, however, was later removed.

The devil logo has appeared on Underwood products that are not deviled as part of the overall brand identity, such as sardines, liverwurst spread and chicken breast. In the 1980s, an animated version of the devil logo was created for TV advertising.

Other companies have made deviled ham products. In 1895, at least seven other companies produced their own versions of a deviled ham, among them Armour and Company, and in 1900 Libby's entered the market with its own deviled ham product.

See also 

 B&G Foods

References

External links 

 Official website

American companies established in 1822
Food and drink companies established in 1822
Companies based in Boston
Food manufacturers of the United States
American companies disestablished in 1982
1822 establishments in Massachusetts
1982 disestablishments in Massachusetts